Navin Valrani is the Vice Chairman and Group Managing Director at the Al Shirawi Group, a private family-owned industrial conglomerate based in Dubai, UAE. and the CEO of Arcadia Education, the Al Shirawi Group's foray into K-12 education.

Education and personal life 
Navin Valrani is one of three sons of Mohan G. Valrani, an Indian businessman, and one of two co-founders of the Al Shirawi Group.

Valrani grew up in Dubai, UAE and attended Dubai College, the prestigious 40-year old British secondary school located in the heart of Dubai.   He graduated in 1993 from The Wharton School, the undergraduate business school of the University of Pennsylvania. He also holds an MBA from the London Business School, and a Masters in Education from the University of Pennsylvania's Graduate School of Education.

Navin Valrani is presently a member of the Board of Overseers at the University of Pennsylvania's Graduate School of Education, the Wharton Executive Board for Europe, Middle East and Africa, and also sat on the Board of Directors of the Wharton Alumni Association from 1997 to 2003. He is also the former chairperson of the Emirates Chapter of the Young Presidents' Organization, a global network of young chief executives.

Navin Valrani was ranked as Facilities Management CEO of the Year in the 2014 Arabian Business Indian CEO Awards  and currently sits at number 2 on Facilities Management Middle East's ranking of the Facilities Management Power 50. He was also on the Forbes Middle East list of Top Indian Business Leaders 2017: The Next Generation. In 2018, Navin Valrani was cited as one of "UAE's most influential business leaders" in the Construction Week Power 100.

Navin is married to Monica Valrani, CEO of Ladybird Nurseries in Dubai. Monica Valrani is the owner of  Dubai's first dedicated LEED Gold certified early years learning facility in Dubai. Monica and Navin Valrani have two sons together, Rohan and Kunal. Rohan Valrani is currently the Vice President of Marketing and serves on the board of the Student Federal Credit Union at the University of Pennsylvania. In 2016, 15-year old Kunal Valrani, launched a gaming app named Hungry Harry to combat malnutrition and promote healthy eating. He spent 365 days coding and working with a nutritionist to make the app a reality.

Career 

Navin continues to lead the Education, Engineering and Healthcare cluster of companies in the Al Shirawi Group. He is presently CEO of the following companies:

Arcadia School: English Primary School in Dubai 
 The Leminar Group: Air conditioning and oil field supply services in the UAE, Qatar, Oman, and Kuwait
Al Shirawi Facilities Management (FM) LLC
Al Shirawi Electrical & Mechanical Engineering (ASEME) Company LLC
Al Shirawi Contracting: Waterproofing, interior design and construction
Visionwood International LLC: Interior and building wood products (doors, cabinets, hotel and kitchen fixtures) 
Oasis Coils and Coatings: HVAC coil manufacturing
Al Shirawi US Chillers: A joint venture with US Chillers Services, a heavy tonnage chiller services and energy provider operating in New York, Dubai, Abu Dhabi and Doha

In June 2017, Navin Valrani designed the region's first business curriculum at the primary school level for students attending Arcadia School in Dubai. He presently teaches the curriculum at the school, known as the "Jr MBA", to pupils from Year 1 upwards. His dedication to teaching and service led on to him being awarded the William B. Castetter Alumni Award of Merit by the University of Pennsylvania's Graduate School of Education in 2019.

Philanthropy 
Valrani created the Monica and Navin Valrani Scholarship fund to help female students complete a university education. He also became a campaign committee member at London Business School to successfully help the school raise over £100m by 2018.

References 

Living people
Year of birth missing (living people)